Shpola is a city located in Zvenyhorodka Raion of Cherkasy Oblast (province) in central Ukraine. It hosts the administration of Shpola urban hromada, one of the hromadas of Ukraine. It had a population of

Administrative status
In 1797, Shpola became part of the Zvenigorod district in the Kiev Governorate. It has been a city since 1938. Until 18 July, 2020, Shpola served as an administrative center of Shpola Raion. The raion was abolished in July 2020 as part of the administrative reform of Ukraine, which reduced the number of raions of Cherkasy Oblast to four. The area of Shpola Raion was merged into Zvenyhorodka Raion.

History 
After the revolution of 1917, Shpola became first a part of the Ukrainian Soviet Socialist Republic and then of the USSR.

During World War II, Nazi Germany invaded USSR, and the Jewish population of Shpola was massacred in 1942. Today Jews make up around 0.5% of Shpola's population.

Demographics 
In 1847, Shpola's Jewish population numbered 1,156. By 1897, that number had grown to 5,388 of a total population of 11,933, or about 45%. This level held steady until the Second World War. In 1989, the population of the city was 22, 378 people.

International relations 
Shpola is a sister city with Oskaloosa, Iowa.

People 
 Ivan Kulyk (1897-1937) - Ukrainian poet, short stories writer, and diplomat;
 Sergiy Rozhitskiy - Colonel of Ukrainian People's Army;
 Sergiy Dobrovolskiy - Lieutenant of Ukrainian People's Army;
 Oleksandr Tkachenko - chairman of Ukrainian parliament;
 Itzik Feffer (1900-1952) - Yiddish poet;
 Reb Aryeh Leib, "der Shpoler zeyde" (Yiddish: "the grandfather of Shpola") (1725-1812) - Hasidic tzaddik.

See also 

 List of cities in Ukraine

Gallery

References

Shpola Room at the Jewish Escape Room in Brooklyn: https://OneBeforeEscape.com/shpola
 (1972) Історія міст і сіл Української CCP - Черкаська область (History of Towns and Villages of the Ukrainian SSR - Cherkasy Oblast), Kyiv.

Cities in Cherkasy Oblast
Kiev Governorate
Shtetls
Cities of district significance in Ukraine
Holocaust locations in Ukraine